Topi Niemelä (born 25 March 2002) is a Finnish professional ice hockey defenceman currently playing for Oulun Kärpät of the Finnish Liiga on loan as a prospect to the Toronto Maple Leafs of the National Hockey League (NHL). Niemelä was drafted 64th overall by the Maple Leafs in the 2020 NHL Entry Draft, ranking within the top ten of European skaters.

Playing career
Following a break out year with Kärpät in 2021–22 season, Niemelä was signed to a future three-year, entry-level contract with draft club, the Toronto Maple Leafs, on 13 May 2022.

International play 

At the 2021 World Junior Ice Hockey Championships, Niemelä led all defensemen in points, accumulating two goals and six assists on the way to winning the bronze medal with Team Finland. After the end of the tournament, he was named Best Defenceman by the IIHF Directorate. He joined Team Finland again for the 2022 edition of the tournament. The team reached the gold medal game this time, playing against Team Canada, and Niemelä played a pivotal role in the game's most famous moment, when his potentially game-winning shot into a wide open Canadian net was knocked out of midair by Canadian captain Mason McTavish, preventing Finnish victory. The Finns won the silver medal.

Career statistics

Regular season and playoffs

International

References

External links
 

2002 births
Living people
Finnish ice hockey defencemen
Oulun Kärpät players
Sportspeople from Oulu
Toronto Maple Leafs draft picks